Resuscitation is a monthly peer-reviewed medical journal covering research on cardiac arrest and cardiopulmonary resuscitation. It is an official journal of the European Resuscitation Council and is published by Elsevier. The editor-in-chief is Jerry Nolan (University of Southampton).
 The journal is abstracted and idexed in Current Contents, Index Medicus/MEDLINE/PubMed, Embase, Scopus, and the Science Citation Index Expanded. According to the Journal Citation Reports, the journal has a 2018 impact factor of 4.572.

See also 
 List of medical journals
 European Resuscitation Council

References

External links 
 

English-language journals
Elsevier academic journals
Cardiology journals
Monthly journals
Publications established in 1972